The Melon Music Award for Best New Artist is an award presented annually by Kakao M at the annual Melon Music Awards. It was first given at the ceremony's inaugural online ceremony in 2005, and was given in person for the first time starting from the 2009 awards.

Winners and nominees

2000s

2010s

2020s

Gallery

Notes

References 

Melon Music Awards
Music awards for breakthrough artist